The following is a list of characters from the wuxia novel The Legend of the Condor Heroes by Jin Yong. Some of these characters are fictionalised personas of, or are based on, actual historical figures, such as Wang Chongyang, Qiu Chuji, Duan Zhixing, Genghis Khan and Jebe.

Main characters 

 Guo Jing
 Huang Rong
 Yang Kang
 Mu Nianci

Guo Jing and Yang Kang's parents 
 Guo Xiaotian is Guo Jing's father. He made an agreement with his sworn brother, Yang Tiexin, for their children to become either sworn siblings (if they are of the same sex) or a married couple (if they are of opposite sexes). He is killed by Duan Tiande's men during the raid on Niu Family Village.
 Li Ping is Guo Xiaotian's wife and Guo Jing's mother. After surviving the raid on Niu Family Village, she is captured by Duan Tiande but manages to escape to Mongolia, where she settles down and gives birth to Guo Jing. Towards the end of the novel, she commits suicide to remind Guo Jing of his heritage when Genghis Khan tries to force Guo Jing to help him conquer the Song Empire.
 Yang Tiexin is Yang Kang's father who specialises in using the Yang Family Spear. He survives the attack on Niu Family Village, renames himself Mu Yi, and adopts Mu Nianci as his daughter. Although he is reunited with his family later, his son refuses to acknowledge him so he ultimately commits suicide with his wife when they are cornered by Wanyan Honglie's men.
 Bao Xiruo is Yang Tiexin's wife and Yang Kang's mother. A soft-hearted and empathetic person, as implied by her name "Xiruo" (literally "pity the weak"), she survives the raid on Niu Family Village. Wanyan Honglie saves her, brings her back to the Jin Empire and marries her. However, she has remained faithful to Yang Tiexin all these years. Eventually, she commits suicide with her husband when they are cornered by Wanyan Honglie's men.

Seven Freaks of Jiangnan 
The "Seven Freaks of Jiangnan" is a group of seven martial artists from Jiangnan who teach Guo Jing martial arts and Han Chinese culture. Ke Zhen'e was blinded many years ago in a fight against Mei Chaofeng and Chen Xuanfeng. Zhang Asheng is killed by Chen Xuanfeng while the rest except Ke Zhen'e are murdered by Ouyang Feng and Yang Kang later.
 Ke Zhen'e, nicknamed "Flying Bat", is highly skilled in using the staff and dart-throwing even though he has been blinded.
 Zhu Cong, nicknamed "Marvellous-Handed Scholar", is the wisest among the seven. He specialises in thieving and pickpocketing.
 Han Baoju, nicknamed "Horse Deity", specialises in horse-riding.
 Nan Xiren, nicknamed "Southern Hill Woodcutter", is a shy individual who teaches Guo Jing to use the saber.
 Zhang Asheng, nicknamed "Laughing Buddha", is a fat monk and Han Xiaoying's lover. He is slain by Mei Chaofeng.
 Quan Jinfa, nicknamed "Hidden Hero in the Busy City", specialises in using the spear or lance.
 Han Xiaoying, nicknamed "Yue Maiden Sword", is Zhang Asheng's lover and the only female among the seven. A descendant of the Yue Maiden, she specialises in using the sword.

Mongol Empire 
 Temüjin is an ambitious warlord who unites all the Mongol tribes under his rule and becomes Genghis Khan. Guo Jing grows up in Mongolia under the care of the Khan, who treats him like a son. Towards the end of the novel, he tries to force Guo Jing to help him conquer the Song Empire, but Guo Jing refuses and flees Mongolia. The Khan ultimately forgives Guo Jing and invites him back to Mongolia, where they have a chat about what makes someone a hero.
 Jochi, Chagatai and Ögedei are Genghis Khan's first three sons.
 Tolui is Genghis Khan's fourth son who becomes sworn brothers with Guo Jing in their childhood.
 Huazheng is Genghis Khan's daughter. She was Guo Jing's childhood playmate and has a crush on him but Guo regards her as a younger sister. Her father betroths her to Guo but they are not married eventually. When she discovers that Guo is planning to disobey her father's order to attack the Song Empire, she secretly reports Guo to her father in the hope that Guo will be forced to remain in Mongolia. However, in doing so, she unknowingly brings big trouble to Guo and indirectly causes his mother to commit suicide. Overwhelmed by guilt over what happened to Guo's mother, she leaves home and became a recluse for the rest of her life. Before leaving, she warns Guo that the Mongols are planning to attack Xiangyang.
 Jebe is an expert archer from a rival tribe who later becomes one of Genghis Khan's most trusted men. He teaches Guo Jing archery and Guo impresses everyone with his skill in archery when he once shoots down two eagles in the sky with a single arrow.
 Muqali, Chilaun, Huduhu and Jelme and Borokhula are among Genghis Khan's followers. Some of them show up to save Hong Qigong, Guo Jing, Huang Rong, Huazheng and others when they were trapped by Yang Kang and Ouyang Feng.
 Jamukha is Genghis Khan's sworn brother and ally who becomes his rival later.
 Wang Khan is a former ally of Genghis Khan and Jamukha who sides with Jamukha later in the war between Genghis Khan and Jamukha.
 Sangkun is Wang Khan's son.
 Dushi is Sangkun's son and Huazheng's original fiancé.

Quanzhen School 

 Wang Chongyang, nicknamed "Central Divine" and is only mentioned by name in the novel, was the founder of the Quanzhen School. Regarded as the most powerful martial artist in the jianghu in his time, he was the first among the five winners of the martial arts contest on Mount Hua and had won the Nine Yin Manual as his prize.
 Zhou Botong, nicknamed "Old Imp" for his childish behaviour despite his old age, is Wang Chongyang's junior and a formidable martial artist.
The "Seven Immortals of Quanzhen" are Wang Chongyang's seven apprentices who lead the Quanzhen School after their master's death.
 Ma Yu, also known as Danyangzi, teaches Guo Jing some basic Quanzhen martial arts and inner energy skills.
 Tan Chuduan, also known as Changzhenzi, is killed by Ouyang Feng in a fight.
 Liu Chuxuan is also known as Changshengzi.
 Qiu Chuji, also known as Changchunzi, befriends the Guo and Yang families and becomes Yang Kang's martial arts master later.
 Wang Chuyi, also known as Yuyangzi, befriends Guo Jing after learning that Guo has learnt some Quanzhen skills from Ma Yu before. Guo helps him recover when he is injured by Lingzhi Shangren.
 Hao Datong is also known as Guangningzi.
 Sun Bu'er is also known as Qingjing Sanren.
 Yin Zhiping is one of Qiu Chuji's apprentices. He goes to Mongolia to remind Guo Jing of his scheduled match with Yang Kang.
 Cheng Yaojia is Sun Bu'er's apprentice. At one point, she is almost raped by Ouyang Ke, but Guo Jing and Huang Rong save her. It turns out later that she is Wu Mianfeng's daughter and has been adopted by the Cheng family. She eventually marries Lu Guanying.

Peach Blossom Island 
 Huang Yaoshi, nicknamed "Eastern Heretic", is the master of Peach Blossom Island and one of the five winners of the martial arts contest on Mount Hua.
 Feng Heng, who is mentioned by name only, was Huang Yaoshi's wife and Huang Rong's mother who died shortly after giving birth to Huang Rong. She had photographic memory and memorised the second volume of the Nine Yin Manual after reading it once.
 The "Twin Killers in the Dark Wind" are Huang Yaoshi's two most senior apprentices. They eloped, stole their master's copy of the Nine Yin Manual, and fled from Peach Blossom Island. They learn two skills derived from an unorthodox interpretation of the manual: the Nine Yin White Bone Claw and the Heart Shattering Palm. The couple are known for committing heinous crimes and are highly feared in the jianghu. They are: 
 Chen Xuanfeng is nicknamed "Copper Corpse". He fights with the "Seven Freaks of Jiangnan" and tries to hold a six-year-old Guo Jing hostage but the boy instinctively stabs him with a dagger and kills him.
 Mei Chaofeng was originally named Mei Ruohua and nicknamed "Iron Corpse". After she is blinded by Ke Zhen'e in a fight, she manages to escape and improve her fighting skills with the goal of avenging her husband. Later, she meets Huang Yaoshi, who forgives her for her betrayal and tells her to find his other four apprentices. She is eventually killed by Ouyang Feng.
 Qu Lingfeng is Huang Yaoshi's third apprentice. He makes his first appearance as Qu San, a crippled neighbour of Guo Xiaotian and Yang Tiexin. In the day, he pretends to run the inn in Niu Family Village. At night, he disguises himself and steals treasures from the palace. Guo and Yang discover his secret after witnessing him fighting with palace guards. He is killed by Shi Yanming, a palace guard. His skeleton is discovered by Guo Jing and Huang Rong several years later in a secret chamber in the inn.
 Lu Chengfeng is Huang Yaoshi's fourth apprentice who inherits his master's knowledge of medicine and strategic formations. After his banishment from Peach Blossom Island, he settled in a manor near Lake Tai and became the leader of a group of pirates who rob the rich and corrupt to help the poor. He moves to Dasheng Pass with his family and followers after his home is destroyed by Ouyang Feng, and eventually dies of natural causes.
 Wu Mianfeng was Huang Yaoshi's fifth apprentice who died of illness before the events of the novel take place.
 Feng Mofeng, who is mentioned by name only, is Huang Yaoshi's sixth apprentice.
 Shagu is Qu Lingfeng's intellectually disabled daughter whom Guo Jing and Huang Rong encounter at the inn in Niu Family Village. Later, after Huang Yaoshi learns that she is Qu Lingfeng's daughter, he accepts her as a grand-apprentice and takes her back to Peach Blossom Island.
 Lu Guanying is Lu Chengfeng's son. His father refuses to teach him martial arts without permission from Huang Yaoshi, so he learns from Reverend Kumu instead. He marries Cheng Yaojia after falling in love with her on first sight, with Huang Yaoshi as the matchmaker.

Beggars' Gang 

 Hong Qigong, nicknamed "Northern Beggar", is the chief of the Beggars' Gang and one of the five winners of the martial arts contest on Mount Hua.
 Lu Youjiao is an elder of the gang who befriends Guo Jing and Huang Rong.
 Elder Peng is a lecherous fiend who lusts for Mu Nianci. He betrays the gang and joins the Mongols eventually.
 Elder Jian
 Elder Liang
 Li Sheng is a brave member of the gang who fights with Ouyang Ke to rescue Ouyang's victims, even though he knows he cannot win Ouyang. Guo Jing and Huang Rong show up to help him and he recognises them as Hong Qigong's apprentices. He refuses to kill Guo and Huang when Yang Kang orders him to do so, and chooses to commit suicide instead.
 Yu Zhaoxing

Ouyang family 
 Ouyang Feng, nicknamed "Western Venom", is the master of a manor on Mount White Camel in the Western Regions and one of the five winners of the martial arts contest on Mount Hua.
 Ouyang Ke is Ouyang Feng's nephew who later turns out to be Ouyang Feng's illegitimate son. A lecherous fiend, he enjoys preying on young and beautiful maidens, especially Huang Rong, Mu Nianci and Cheng Yaojia. He initially wants Guo Jing's Ferghana horse and later becomes Guo's rival in vying for Huang Rong's affection. His attempts on Huang Rong have ended up in failure and shame for himself every time; at one point, his legs are crushed by a boulder in a booby trap set by Huang Rong. He is eventually murdered by Yang Kang after attempting to molest Mu Nianci and Cheng Yaojia.

Wanyan Honglie and associates 
 Wanyan Honglie is the sixth prince of the Jin Empire who meets Bao Xiruo by chance and falls in love with her. He then bribes Duan Tiande to lead his men to raid Niu Family Village so that he can pretend to rescue Bao Xiruo. After succeeding, he marries Bao Xiruo and raises her son, Yang Kang, as his own. He is obsessed with finding the Book of Wumu as he intends to use the knowledge acquired from the book to eliminate the Jin Empire's enemies and become a hero of his people. His plans are foiled by Guo Jing and Huang Rong, who obtain the book instead. Towards the end of the novel, he travels to Samarkand to form an alliance between the Jin Empire and Khwarezm Empire as part of a last-ditch effort to counter the Mongols. However, he is eventually captured by Mongol forces and executed.
 Wanyan Hongxi is Wanyan Honglie's brother who travels to Mongolia to meet Genghis Khan.
 Sha Tongtian is nicknamed "Devil's Gate Dragon King". His left arm is amputated by Peng Lianhu after being infected with poison from a dying Yang Kang. He betrays Wanyan Honglie at the end of the novel.
 The "Four Devils of the Yellow River" are Sha Tongtian's apprentices:
 Shen Qinggang, nicknamed "Soul-Severing Saber".
 Wu Qinglie, nicknamed "Life-Chasing Spear".
 Ma Qingxiong, nicknamed "Soul-Capturing Whip". He is killed by Lu Guanying's pirates.
 Qian Qingjian, nicknamed "Death's Axe". He is killed by the "Seven Freaks of Jiangnan" in the Mongol camp when he tries to assassinate Guo Jing.
 Hou Tonghai, nicknamed "Three Headed Dragon", is Sha Tongtian's inept junior.
 Liang Ziweng, nicknamed "Ginseng Immortal Old Demon", is an eccentric martial artist from the Changbai Mountains. 20 years ago, he attempted to rape many women but they were saved by Hong Qigong and he suffered a humiliating defeat at Hong's hands. He rears a snake for an experiment, but the snake ends up being killed by Guo Jing, who drinks its blood in the process. Since then, Liang has been stalking Guo and wanting to suck his blood, believing that it will make him more powerful. Hong Qigong shows up to help Guo, and Liang shuns away in fear when he recognises Hong. At the end of the novel, Liang loses his footing in a final attempt to kill Guo at Mount Hua and falls to his death.
 Lingzhi Shangren is a Tibetan monk who poisons Wang Chuyi in a fight.
 Peng Lianhu, nicknamed "Thousand Hands Human Butcher", is a notorious mass murderer who poisons Ma Yu in a fight.

Dali Kingdom 
 Reverend Yideng, previously known as Duan Zhixing and nicknamed "Southern Emperor", is the former ruler of the Dali Kingdom and one of the five winners of the martial arts contest on Mount Hua. He has since abdicated and become a Buddhist monk.
 Liu Ying, also known as Yinggu, is nicknamed "Divine Mathematician". She was Duan Zhixing's concubine when he was still the ruler of Dali. However, he neglected her due to his obsession with martial arts, so she had a secret affair with Zhou Botong and bore him a son. After the infant was severely injured by a masked attacker (Qiu Qianren), she pleaded with Duan to save her son but he refused and the infant died. Since then, she has been leading a reclusive life in the Black Swamp while plotting revenge on Duan and searching for Zhou Botong and her son's killer. During this time, she self-learns mathematics and martial arts and becomes a formidable fighter.
 Yideng's aides:
 Chu Dongshan, nicknamed "Reclusive Fisherman of Diancang", disguised as a fisherman, was previously a naval admiral in Dali.
 Zhang Shaoshou, disguised as a woodcutter, was previously an army general in Dali.
 Wu Santong, disguised as a farmer, was previously the chief of the palace guard.
 Zhu Ziliu, disguised as a scholar, was previously the premier of Dali.
 The Indian Monk is Yideng's junior, and an expert in medicine and healing. He translates for Guo Jing and Huang Rong the part of the Nine Yin Manual that was written in Sanskrit.

Iron Palm Gang 
 Qiu Qianren is the leader of the Iron Palm Gang and an apprentice of Shangguan Jiannan, a subordinate of the Song general Han Shizhong. He is one of the more powerful fighters in the jianghu after the Five Greats, and is nicknamed "Iron Palm Skimming on Water" for his prowess in martial arts and qinggong. He committed various heinous crimes, including killing Yinggu's infant son and collaborating with Jin soldiers to terrorise Song citizens. After he nearly dies on Mount Hua, he is saved by Reverend Yideng and feels so remorseful for his past deeds that he repents. He is renamed Ci'en and becomes Yideng's apprentice.
 Qiu Qianzhang is Qiu Qianren's twin brother. He is inferior to his brother in terms of moral character and martial arts prowess, and relies on impersonating his brother to con and deceive others for a living. He falls to his death from Iron Palm Peak.
 Yashaogong
 Chief Qiao, Chief He and Chief Shi are three stronghold chiefs in the gang.

Song Empire 
 Huang Chang was a book transcriber who lived during the Northern Song dynasty. Emperor Huizong tasked him with transcribing a collection of 5,481 volumes of Taoist texts. As he was commissioned by the emperor, Huang Chang approached his task meticulously and gradually became well-versed in the Taoist classics, which provided him with a strong foundation for mastering powerful martial arts based on Taoist philosophy. Later, acting on Emperor Huizong's order, Huang Chang led imperial forces to attack the Ming Cult, killed many martial arts experts, and made several enemies in the jianghu. His enemies killed his family in revenge. Huang Chang went into hiding for 40 years and spent his time training in martial arts and thinking of ways to counter his enemies' moves. By the time he was done, his enemies were already dead so he lost his chance to avenge his family. By then, he realised that his days were numbered, so he spent his last days compiling his knowledge and experiences into a two-volume martial arts manual, the Nine Yin Manual. After his death, the Nine Yin Manual became the most coveted object in the jianghu for around a century until Wang Chongyang won the first martial arts contest on Mount Hua and claimed the manual as his prize.
 Duan Tiande is a military officer who leads his men to kill Guo Xiaotian and Yang Tiexin. He is actually acting on Wanyan Honglie's orders, as part of Wanyan's plan to win Bao Xiruo's affection. He later reveals the truth unsuspectingly while being held captive in Guiyun Manor, and is eventually slain by Yang Kang.
 Lü Wende is the commander of Xiangyang's military forces. Guo Jing and Huang Rong warn him about the Mongols' invasion at the end of the novel.
 Shi Yanming was a high-ranking palace guard. He and Qu Lingfeng killed each other in a fight in the secret chamber in Qu's inn. His skeleton is discovered many years later by Guo Jing and Huang Rong.
 Wang Daoqian was an official in the Ministry of War. He was killed by Qiu Chuji after the latter discovered his attempt to trade secrets with Wanyan Honglie.
 Jiang Wen is the magistrate of Xiushui County.
 Shi Miyuan
 Ge Yuncong is the prefect of Jiaxing.
 Han Tuozhou
 Tang Zude

Xianxia School 
 Reverend Kumu is the abbot of Yunqi Monastery and a member of the Xianxia School. He is Duan Tiande's uncle and Lu Guanying's martial arts master. Duan lies to him that Qiu Chuji is a murderous villain after his life. Kumu believes his nephew and enlists the help of the "Seven Freaks of Jiangnan" to fight Qiu, resulting in a big misunderstanding.
 Reverend Jiaomu died incidentally during a fight between Qiu Chuji and the "Seven Freaks of Jiangnan".

Others 
 Ala ad-Din Muhammad II is the ruler of the Khwarezm Empire. He dies of pleurisy after his empire falls to the Mongols.

Condor Trilogy
Lists of Jin Yong characters
Fictional Song dynasty people